David Scott Clark (born 5 January 1973) is a New Zealand Labour Party politician who is the Member of Parliament for Dunedin. He was the Minister of Health until July 2020, when he resigned after multiple controversies related to the response to COVID-19. Previously he had been Opposition Spokesperson for Small Business and Economic Development.

In November 2020 he became the Minister of Commerce and Consumer Affairs, Statistics, Digital Economy and Communications, State Owned Enterprises and the Minister responsible for the Earthquake Commission. Following his announcement on 13 December 2022 that he would be stepping down from politics at the next general election, his portfolios were transferred to other ministers in a Cabinet reshuffle on 31 January 2023.

Early life
Clark grew up in Beachlands, just south of Auckland, and was schooled in Auckland. He studied at Saint Kentigern College and spent his last year on a school exchange in Germany, immersing himself in the German language.

In 1991, Clark moved to Dunedin to study at the University of Otago. He initially studied medicine but abandoned that in favour of pursuing degrees in theology and philosophy. Clark also studied theology and philosophy at Eberhard Karls University in Tübingen.

Ordained in 1997, Clark is a Presbyterian minister. He worked as the Assistant Minister at St Lukes Presbyterian Church in Auckland. He was the celebrant at the civil union of MP Grant Robertson. Clark later returned to the University of Otago and completed a PhD on the work of German/New Zealand refugee and existentialist thinker Helmut Rex. He has also worked as a Treasury analyst and the warden of Selwyn College at the University of Otago. Before his election to Parliament, Clark served as deputy chair of the Otago Community Trust.

Member of Parliament

After serving as chairman on the Labour Party Dunedin North electorate committee, Clark was selected by the Labour Party to replace the retiring Pete Hodgson in the electorate. He won the seat at the 2011 election over National candidate Michael Woodhouse. Clark would defeat Woodhouse again in each of the following three elections, increasing his majority every time.

Opposition, 2011–2017
Clark's maiden parliamentary speech focused on his concern about rising inequality and his passion for social justice. In it, he argued that a more equal society will produce better outcomes, both socially and economically.

Under Labour leaders David Shearer, David Cunliffe and Andrew Little, Clark served as the party's spokesperson in a range of economic portfolios, including revenue, economic development and small business. In Opposition he served as Labour's spokesperson for various areas, including Revenue, Economic Development, Small Business, Tertiary Education, and Health. During his time as Revenue spokesperson, he drew attention to difficulties the dated Inland Revenue computer system was creating for the organisation, and the small amounts that multinational companies were contributing to the tax base.

Clark completed an Eisenhower Fellowship in 2013, focusing much of his trip on the priority accorded to the values of fairness and freedom in New Zealand and the United States. The same year, Parliament passed a private member's bill in Clark's name. The bill proposed "Mondayisation" of Waitangi Day and Anzac Day so that additional public holidays would be held if the true dates for those holidays occurred on a weekend. This was the first Bill to pass against the Government in four years.

After the retirement of long-serving Labour MP Annette King was announced in March 2017, Clark became the Labour Party's health spokesperson.

Sixth Labour Government, 2017–present

First term, 2017–2020
After the 2017 general election, the Labour Party formed a government with New Zealand First and the Greens. Clark was appointed to the Cabinet as Minister of Health and Associate Minister of Finance.

In late April 2018, Clark appointed three new chairs to head Auckland's three district health boards: Patrick Snedden for the Auckland District Health Board, Judy McGregor for the Waitematā District Health Board, and Vui Mark Gosche for the Counties Manukau District Health Board. These appointments replace Lester Levy, who had headed all three boards and resigned in December 2017. On 30 April 2018, Clark conceded that the Government would be unable to deliver on its election promise of reducing general practitioner fees but indicated that it would be introduced in phases over time.

On 4 May 2018, Clark announced that the Dunedin Hospital would be replaced by a new hospital on the site of the former Cadbury factory site and a neighbouring block that included the building occupied by Work and Income. The construction project is estimated to cost NZ$1.4 billion, would involve around a thousand workers, and is expected to be completed by 2026.

In mid-June 2018, Clark was criticised by employees of the Counties Manukau District Health Board for allegedly trying to silence their reports of run-down buildings, asbestos, and overflowing sewage at Middlemore Hospital. Clark denied those allegations but criticised the staff for communicating through the media rather than through official channels. Clark subsequently apologized to Counties Manukau DHB chairman Rabin Rabindran for the handling of the Middlemore saga. That same month, Clark defended the Government's $500 million pay offer to nurses after the national union, the New Zealand Nurses Organisation, voted to go on strike.

In mid-July 2018, Clark was forced to publicly defend his decision to go on a family holiday prior to a planned national strike by the Nurses Organisation. On 25 July, Clark—alongside union representatives from the E tū and the Public Service Association as well as the Ministry of Social Development and the Accident Compensation Corporation—signed a NZ$173.5 million pay equity agreement to pay 5,000 mental health and addiction workers more. Later that month, he announced that the District Health Boards, Nurses Organisation, and the Ministry of Health had successfully negotiated a joint accord to ensure safe staffing levels for nurses.
 
In early September 2018, Clark suspended the troubled Oracle IT project to overhaul the District Health Boards' ageing IT systems. The troubled project had cost NZ$100 million. In mid-November, Clark announced that the Government had scrapped plans for a proposed third medical school in the Waikato region on the grounds that the project would have cost billions to set up and operate. On 19 November, he also announced that the Government would establish a NZ$20 million new health centre in the South Island town of Westport.

COVID-19 pandemic
As Minister of Health, Clark took a leadership role in the Government's response to the COVID-19 pandemic in New Zealand. In early April 2020, Clark drew media attention and public criticism when he drove to a Dunedin park two kilometres away from his home to ride a mountain bike trail despite the Government's COVID-19 pandemic lockdown. Clark later apologised to prime minister Jacinda Ardern for ignoring official guidelines advising against non-essential travel. During the first week of the country's national lock-down he also drove his family twenty kilometres to a beach for a walk. Ardern subsequently announced that Clark offered his resignation, but due to his role in the response to the COVID-19 pandemic, she did not accept it, instead depriving him of his ministerial role as Associate Finance Minister and demoting him to the bottom of Labour's Cabinet ranking.

In late June 2020, Clark attracted media attention and criticism following a press conference at which he stated, "The director-general  has accepted that protocols weren't being followed, he has accepted responsibility for that and has set about putting it right". His remark was interpreted by some journalists as blaming Bloomfield for the Ministry of Health's mismanagement of quarantine following a recent outbreak stemming from overseas travel. The Spinoff editor Toby Manhire opined that Clark's "humility bypass" created problems for Ardern's government. Left-wing commentator Chris Trotter described Clark's handling of the situation as "shameful" and called on Ardern to dismiss him from his position. Right-wing commentator Trish Anderson criticised Clark for not "'pulling his weight' in the government" and criticised Ardern's perceived inaction against him as a "failure of leadership." Clark's Wikipedia article was also vandalised with remarks attacking his handling of the press conference with Bloomfield.

In early July 2020, Clark announced that he was resigning as Minister of Health, stating that "I've always taken a view that the team must come first ... so I've made the call that it's best for me to step aside." Ardern accepted his resignation, stating that she "accepted Clark's conclusion that his presence in the role was creating an unhelpful distraction from the Government's ongoing response to Covid-19 and wider health reforms."

Second term, 2020–present
During the 2020 New Zealand general election held on 17 October, Clark contested the Dunedin electorate and was re-elected, defeating National candidate Michael Woodhouse by a margin of 15,521 votes.

On 2 November 2020, Prime Minister Ardern announced that Clark would be returning to Cabinet but would not be holding his former Health portfolio. Instead, he would pick up the Commerce and Consumer Affairs, Statistics, Digital Economy and Communication and State Owned Enterprises portfolios, as well as becoming Minister Responsible for the Earthquake Commission. During the 2020–2023 term, Clark sponsored the Grocery Industry Competition Bill, which seeks to address excessive supermarket profits and encourage more competition within that sector. He also took an interest in the Commerce Commission's research into the supermarket, construction supplies, and banking sectors.

On 13 December 2022, Clark announced his intention to retire from politics at the 2023 general election. On 31 January 2023, prime minister Chris Hipkins announced a Cabinet re-shuffle of ministerial portfolios, and Clark's portfolios were transferred to other ministers.

Personal life
Clark is married to Katrina, and they have three children. His brother, Ben, stood for Labour in the North Shore at the 2011 election, placing second behind Maggie Barry. During his university years, Clark was a competitive cyclist and has twice completed the Ironman Triathlon.

References

External links
Official website
Profile on New Zealand Labour Party website
Profile on New Zealand Parliament website

|-

|-

|-

|-

|-

1973 births
Living people
New Zealand Labour Party MPs
New Zealand Presbyterian ministers
Politicians from Auckland
Members of the New Zealand House of Representatives
New Zealand MPs for Dunedin electorates
University of Otago alumni
21st-century New Zealand politicians
Candidates in the 2017 New Zealand general election
Members of the Cabinet of New Zealand
Candidates in the 2020 New Zealand general election